Yeh Lamhe Judaai Ke (translation: "The Moments of Separation") is a 2004 Indian Hindi-language romantic mystery film directed by Birendra Nath Tiwari. The film stars Shah Rukh Khan, Raveena Tandon, Navneet Nishan, Divya Desai, Mohnish Behl and Kiran Kumar.

Written by Anirudh Tiwari, this film actually had done most of the filming in 1994, but was not released until 9 April 2004. It was an incomplete film that stopped shooting in 1994 but was revived with different body doubles standing in during scenes that were shot in 2004 to finish the movie, instead of the lead actors Khan and Tandon who refused to even dub for their parts. The trade experts said the film was just being released for the sake of making a quick buck. Upon release, the film received scathing reviews from critics and was a disaster at the box office.

Plot 
Dushant, Jaya, Sujit and Nisha are childhood friends. Dushant aspires to become a successful singer but has little money. Jaya helps him to realize his ambitions. As Dushant achieves success, a rift is created between the two of them. Sujit and Nisha take undue advantage of this to get close to Dushant and create a misunderstanding between him and Jaya. Kamlesh Dhingra, Nisha's father, approaches Dushant for financial assistance for his business venture but is turned down by Rajpal, Dushant's mentor. Dhingra and Sujit plot to amass Dushant's wealth by luring Dushant to marry Nisha and getting rid of Rajpal. Dushant learns of this plot. When Sujit is murdered, Rahul, a police officer, comes to investigate the murder. Nisha is also murdered under mysterious circumstances and Dhingra is also murdered in the same way. In the end it is revealed that it was Jaya's father who committed the murders in vengeance for the murder of his daughter.

Cast
 Shah Rukh Khan as Dushant
 Raveena Tandon as Jaya
 Mohnish Behl as Sujit
 Navneet Nishan as Nisha
 Amit Kumar as Rahul
 Rashmi Desai as Sheetal
 Kiran Kumar as Rajpal
 Deepak Parashar
 Avtar Gill as Kamlesh Dhingra
 Deven Bhojani
 Asit Kumarr Modi (Joker)

Production
Yeh Lamhe Judaai Ke was initially started in 1994 under the title Jaadoo with Shahrukh Khan and Raveena Tandon selected to portray lead roles. However, the film was stalled after shooting few scenes. The film was revived in 2004 with a different title and reshot the film with different actors altering the storyline completely.

Soundtrack

Critical reception
Planet Bollywood wrote "There is no point. Let me just tell you how desperate the filmmaker was to make this movie. The voices of the actors are so horrendous that you feel like crying. The actors look so jaded that they aren’t acting at all. The plot moves so slowly that you can actually predict the very next scene and solve the murder mystery too." Bollywood Hungama wrote "Frankly, watching YEH LAMHE JUDAAI KE is akin to watching two films within one film. If the film begins with the SRK - Raveena track, the other track crops up from nowhere and that involves a bunch of newcomers, all non-actors."

References

External links

2004 films
Rediscovered Indian films
2000s rediscovered films
1990s Hindi-language films
1990s romantic musical films
Indian romantic musical films
1990s musical drama films
2000s Hindi-language films
Films scored by Nikhil-Vinay